Transdev, formerly Veolia Transdev, is a France-based international private-sector company which operates public transport. It has operations in 17 countries and territories as of November 2020.

History

The group was formed by the merger of Veolia Transport and Transdev on 3 April 2011. Veolia Environnement and Caisse des Dépôts et Consignations (CDC) had 50% shareholdings. It was initially planned for the company to be sold by an initial public offering, potentially accompanied by a rebranding, within 12 months of the merger.

On 6 December 2011, Veolia Environment, seeking to reduce debt and focus on its core businesses of water, waste and energy, announced a €5 bn divestment program over 2012/13 that would include a sale of its share in Veolia Transdev within two years. At the time of the announcement, Veolia Transdev declared its intention to concentrate on four main markets (France, the Netherlands, Germany, United States), to develop UK, Asia and Australia and to divest from other countries and other activities amounting to about 9–10% of global revenue in 2012/13. After this announcement, the Caisse des Dépôts et Consignations, for its part, officially reiterated its commitment to Veolia Transdev and its continued support as a shareholder to the group's development.

In early 2012, it was reported that Cube Infrastructure, a fund controlled by the French bank Natixis (Groupe BPCE), was likely to acquire about half of Veolia's stake in Transdev. The Caisse des Dépôts would take over the other half. This was later changed in October 2012 to Caisse des Dépôts acquiring 10% of the shares from Veolia. This however was not implemented. Following the sale of Transdev subsidiary SNCM in late 2015, CDC and Veolia continued talks about selling Veolia's stake in the joint venture. In December 2016, CDC finally bought 20% shares from Veolia. As a result, Veolia's share became 30% while CDC's share became 70%.

In October 2018, Veolia announced its intention to sell its remaining 30% shareholding to the Rethmann Group. The transaction was completed in January 2019, with Rethmann increasing its shareholding to 34% by adding its Rhenus Veniro subsidiary to the Transdev portfolio.

Operational history
At the time of merger, Transdev operated in the following 27 countries. In 2014, the operations at the time were organised into seven geographical areas (struckthrough countries' operations have already ceased):
France
Benelux (Netherlands, Belgium)
North America (US, Canada)
Germany and Central Europe (Croatia, Poland, Czech Republic, Serbia, Slovakia, Slovenia)
The UK and Northern Europe (Finland, Ireland, Sweden)
Asia and the Pacific (Australia, China, South Korea, India, New Zealand)
Southern Europe and the rest of the world (Chile, Colombia, Israel, Morocco, Portugal, Spain)

In 2013 CEO Jérôme Gallot confirmed Veolia Transdev would consolidate its operations down to 17 countries. As of November 2020, Transdev operates in 17 countries spanning across five continents. The list only counts sovereign countries and therefore excludes New Caledonia (France). Jersey, a British Crown dependency and Hong Kong (China), were previously also not counted for the same reason. Veolia Transdev (and Transdev) operated MyBus operations until 2012 and Hong Kong Tramways until 2020 respectively.

Additionally, Transdev is a shareholder of Transamo, a transport engineering and consultancy firm in Europe that was inherited from the old Transdev. It specialises in the project management of public transport projects in France. Société de Transports intercommunaux de Bruxelles (STIB) is the other major shareholder of Transamo.

Europe

Czech Republic
In December 2018, Transdev commenced operating a 10-year contract in the Moravian-Silesian Region serving Bruntál, Krnov, Nový Jičín and Rýmařov. Transdev had previously operated buses in the Czech Republic until they were sold to Arriva in May 2013 (see Central Europe section below). In August 2019, Transdev acquired the 3CSAD Group that also operated in the Moravian-Silesian Region with 410 buses to become the fourth largest bus operator in the Czech Republic.

France
Transdev's subsidiary Société Varoise de Transports (SVT) has operated two lines of the Bouches du Rhône district network since 1 January 2014, serving a population of more than one million inhabitants.

Transdev also operates many Hérault Transport bus lines in the south of France, and the Montpellier tramway system.

Transdev owned 66% of SNCM, a French ferry company operating in the Mediterranean. However, as of 2014, Transdev was planning to sell its shares. SNCM was finally sold to a Corsican firm Rocca Group in late 2015 and was renamed Maritima Ferries in January 2016.

Thello (see Italy section) operates trains between Italy and France; Transdev relinquished its 33% holding in 2016.

Prior to April 2019, Transdev owned Eurolines who operated coach services around Europe. In July 2015, Eurolines commenced operating 17 coach routes under the Isilines brand to coincide with the deregulation of the French coach market. Eurolines and Isilines were sold to Flixbus in April 2019. Transdev retains Isilines' B2B bus rental activities in France, which will be operated under the Transdev brand.

The shared-van service Supershuttle operated in the country, but it was sold to an affiliate of Blackstreet Capital Management in September 2019, after which it ceased service at the end of 2019 citing that Uber and market changes led to its demise.

Ireland

Transdev operates Dublin's Luas tram system since 2004. Transdev Ireland was renamed from Veolia Transport Ireland in May 2013. In June 2019, Transdev was awarded a new contract to operate and maintain the system for another six years, effective 1 December 2019, with an option for a five-year extension.

Germany

Transdev Germany operates buses and trains in Germany. It was renamed from Veolia Verkehr GmbH in March 2015.

Rhenus Veniro was Transdev's newest addition its German portfolio as a result of Rhenus's parent company, Rethmann, increasing its shareholding of Transdev to 34%.

The shared-van service Supershuttle operated in Berlin, but it was sold to an affiliate of Blackstreet Capital Management in September 2019, after which it ceased service at the end of 2019 citing that Uber and market changes led to its demise.

Portugal
Transdev Portugal operates bus and coach services all around Portugal, and formerly light rail. It was first established in 1997 to tender for the Metro do Porto light rail through the consortium Normetro. The light rail opened in 2002 and was operated by Transdev Portugal until 2010. Transdev Portugal also acquired the CAIMA Group in 2002 and the Joalto Group in 2010. It was rewarded the AveiroBus network with 24 buses, 1 ferry boat and 2 boats, effective from 1 January 2017.

The shared-van service Supershuttle operated in the country, but it was sold to an affiliate of Blackstreet Capital Management in September 2019, after which it ceased service at the end of 2019 citing that Uber and market changes led to its demise.

Netherlands

Transdev Netherlands is made up of two operations, Connexxion and Witte Kruis. There used to be an additional operation called Veolia Transport Nederland, until the branding was discontinued and replaced by Connexxion in December 2016. Transdev Netherlands was set up in December 2015 to group the three operations together under one brand, after bringing Connexxion and Veolia Transport Nederland under one management earlier in May that year. Each operation continued to exist separately with its branding unchanged until the rebranding of Veolia Transport Nederland. This arrangement was planned ever since the global rebranding of Veolia Transdev in 2013.

In October 2007 Transdev acquired a 50% shareholding in Connexxion. In February 2013 Transdev's shareholding increased to 86%.

Veolia Transport Nederland operated bus, train and ferry services around Netherlands since 1997. In December 2016, the last remaining concession of Veolia Transport Nederland was rebranded to Connexxion. Witte Kruis (Dutch for White Cross) is Transdev's mobile care organization in Netherlands.

The shared-van service Supershuttle operated in the country, but it was sold to an affiliate of Blackstreet Capital Management in September 2019, after which it ceased service at the end of 2019 citing that Uber and market changes led to its demise.

Spain
Transdev is one of the few companies that make up TramMet, a joint venture company that operates two tram lines in Barcelona: Trambaix and Trambesòs. Transdev has 66% stake in the operating companies of the tram networks, and 5.53% of the concession companies.

Transdev, together with Saycr and Ineco, also formerly formed the Tenemetro, S.L., which had a 14% stake (out of which, Transdev 8.5%) of Metropolitano de Tenerife (MTSA), the operator of Tenerife Tram since 2003. Cabildo Insular de Tenerife (the Tenerife Island Government) also owned 80% stake of the company. This tram operation was passed down from the old Transdev. The 14% was sold back to the Cabildo (Tenerife government) on 4 April 2017, who now owns 100% of MTSA.

Transdev also participated in the pre-operation and operation of the Tranvía de Murcia and the Metro Ligero Oeste in Madrid.

The shared-van service Supershuttle operated in the country, but it was sold to an affiliate of Blackstreet Capital Management in September 2019, after which it ceased service at the end of 2019 citing that Uber and market changes led to its demise.

Sweden
Transdev, known as Transdev Sverige AB, operates a number of subsidiaries in Sweden. The company was rebranded from Veolia Transport Sverige AB on 2 February 2015. Its subsidiaries are:

 Bussakuten
 Norrköping: Transdev operates the Norrköping tramway on behalf of Östgötatrafiken.
 People Travel Group
 Snälltåget, an operator which runs long distance trains from Malmö to Stockholm and Uppsala, in the winter season going further on to Åre, and the long distance train from Malmö to Berlin with train ferry via Trelleborg to Sassnitz in the summer season.
 Styrsöbolaget, a ferry company in Gothenburg, which operates the cross-river ferries (Älvsnabben) as well as the ferries to the south archipelago. 
 Transdev also operates some local city bus networks or interurban lines on contract to the local authorities (Västtrafik).
Transdev operates local bus services in north Stockholm on behalf of SL from 2019.

Transdev also won the tender to operate bus services in Umeå from 13 June 2016.

In January 2018, Transdev completed its acquisition of Blidösundsbolaget, a ferry operator in the Stockholm archipelago. It currently operates on one of the four ferry contracts in the Stockholm archipelago. In December 2018, Blidösundsbolaget was awarded a second and the largest of the Stockholm archipelago contracts, for a period of nine years starting December 2019. Additionally, in April 2018, Blidösundsbolaget has been commissioned to operate the shuttle service on Ekerölinjen no. 89 for seven years starting in August 2018.

In July 2019, Transdev Sweden won a 10-year bus market worth €757 million, comprising five contracts, in the Västra Götaland region in Gothenburg. The contracts will commence in December 2020. Later that month (July 2019), Transdev announced the acquisition of A Björks AB, a major bus operator in Central and Northern Sweden. The acquisition was completed in September 2019 and Transdev became Sweden's third largest public transportation operator.

In 2020, Transdev Sweden sold bus company Flygbussarna Airport Coaches to Vy Buss.

Ceased contracts:

 Stockholm:  Until April 2012, Veolia Transport (now Transdev) was running three tram networks (Lidingöbanan, Nockebybanan and Tvärbanan) and a local railway (Saltsjöbanan) in the city on behalf of SL.

United Kingdom

In the United Kingdom, Transdev operates Transdev Blazefield, Trident Niven, Black Car Service and holds an 18% shareholding in Nottingham City Transport.

Transdev Blazefield is a bus group with operations in Yorkshire and Lancashire. It has seven operating subsidiaries:

Blackburn Bus Company
Burnley Bus Company
Harrogate Bus Company
Keighley Bus Company
Rosso
Team Pennine
Yorkshire Coastliner

Transdev owns three car services in London. Green Tomato Cars is an environmentally friendly passenger car service in London and was established in 2006. Trident Niven, acquired in December 2012, is a London-based private hire company and has a fleet of 100 cars. Black Car Service, established in May 2014, is a new corporate chauffeured car service in London, with a fleet of 150 black unbranded Volkswagen CCs (as of May 2014).

In April 2021, it was announced that Transdev had reached an agreement with Arriva to purchase Yorkshire Tiger, with the business rebranded Team Pennine upon completion in July 2021.

Former UK operations
Arrow Light Rail, a consortium between the original Transdev, Nottingham City Transport, Bombardier Transportation, Carillion, Galaxy and Innisfree, was contracted to build and operate the Nottingham Express Transit for 30.5 years from 9 March 2004. However, the contract was terminated in 2011 when Tramlink Nottingham (a Keolis consortium) was selected as the preferred bidder for the construction of Phase 2 of the light rail and operation of the network. The last day of operations of Arrow Light Rail was 16 December 2011, few months after the establishment of Veolia Transdev.

The old Transdev used to own London Sovereign and London United, two of the 20 bus operators serving London, up to the merger with Veolia Transport in March 2011. Veolia Transdev took over London Sovereign from the old Transdev until it was sold to RATP Group in April 2014. Veolia Transdev never took over London United, instead it passed to RATP.

The shared-van service Supershuttle operated in the country, but it was sold to an affiliate of Blackstreet Capital Management in September 2019, after which it ceased service at the end of 2019 citing that Uber and market changes led to its demise.

Green Tomato Cars, which Transdev owned since 2010, was sold to Travelhire in February 2019. The sale marked Transdev's exit from the UK private hire market.

Former operations

Belgium
In Belgium, Veolia Transdev's operations were known as Veolia Transport Belgium (VTB). VTB was sold to a consortium consisting of Cube Infrastructure and Gimv in March 2014.

Central Europe

In Central Europe, Veolia Transdev's operations were known as Veolia Transport Central Europe GmbH (VTCE) and included operations in Czech Republic, Slovakia, Poland and Serbia. They were sold to Arriva in May 2013. From 2022 again active in Slovakia as Transdev.

Italy

Thello was a joint venture between Transdev and Italian state owned railway company Trenitalia, operating train services between France and Italy since 2011. Transdev sold its 33% holding to Trenitalia in 2016, giving the latter full control.

Jersey

Between September 2002 and December 2012, Veolia Transdev (and previously Veolia Transport) operated Connex Transport Jersey, with the route network branded as MyBus for some of this period.

Switzerland
The shared-van service Supershuttle operated in the country, but it was sold to an affiliate of Blackstreet Capital Management in September 2019, after which it ceased service at the end of 2019 citing that Uber and market changes led to its demise.

Finland
Transdev operated in Finland as Transdev Finland Oy. It was rebranded from Veolia Transport Finland Oy on 5 February 2015. The operations of Transdev Finland ended at the end of 2019.

North America
Transdev North America, formerly Veolia Transportation until August/September 2014, is the North American business unit of Transdev. It operates a number of public transport services across the United States and Canada.

Other North American operations inherited from the old Transdev (Limocar) were never part of Veolia Transportation and therefore are not part of Transdev North America.

On October 26, 2022, Transdev has signed an agreement to acquire First Transit, Inc.   On March 7, 2023, Transdev completed the acquisition of First Transit, all current First Transit contracts are now operating under the Transdev brand.

Canada
Transdev Canada is the Transdev subsidiary in Canada and it has the following operations:
York BRT Services L.P: A subsidiary of Transdev Canada in York Region, Ontario, it runs the York Region Transit's Vaughan routes. It also formerly operated the Viva Rapid Transit (Purple, Orange, Green, Pink and Blue) routes since April 2005 until they were taken over in June 2015 by Tok Transit, who won the contract in April 2014.
Valley light rail line in Edmonton, Alberta: Transdev will operate the Valley Line as part of the TransEd consortium. It is scheduled for completion in 2020.
Limocar: A coach operator in Quebec
Quebec: Transdev operates buses, school buses and coaches in the province of Quebec, including the Saint-Jean-sur-Richelieu public transit.
Voyago: Operates school buses, special needs buses, charters, and patient transfer vehicles.

Transdev Canada announced its acquisition of Voyago on 8 April 2019. Voyago is a Canadian-owned group of transportation companies with a fleet of 970 vehicles, operating services including patient transfer services and student transport services.

United States
Transdev North America US' operations include:
 Arcadia, California: Approximately half of Foothill Transit's services since 5 October 2014 (contract awarded in July 2014)
 Butte County, California: Butte Regional Transit
 Capital Area Transportation Authority: Spec-Tran
 Charleston Area Regional Transportation Authority
 Concord, North Carolina: Concord Kannapolis Area Transit
 Denver, Colorado: Regional Transportation District (RTD) routes throughout the metro-wide District. The contract has been renewed for a three-year term from 2014 with two (one-year) options.
 Detroit Department of Transportation: MetroLift
 Fairfax County, Virginia: Fairfax Connector
 Georgia Regional Transportation Authority: Xpress which services 12 counties in the Atlanta Metropolitan Area
 Gwinnett County, Georgia: Gwinnett County Transit
 Hinesville, Georgia: Liberty Transit
 Jefferson Parish, Louisiana: Jefferson Transit
 Kansas City Area Transportation Authority: RideKC Freedom
 Las Vegas: Paratransit service under contract to Regional Transportation Commission of Southern Nevada (RTC) since early August 2014
 Los Angeles County, California: Los Angeles Metro; Operates 31 foot buses on specific local routes.
 M-1 Rail: QLine since opening in 2017; Transdev operations ended 2021.
 Mesa County, Colorado: Grand Valley Transit
 Miami: Tri-Rail, a train system (contact won in 2007 by Veolia Transportation) in the Miami metropolitan area of Florida
 Milwaukee, Wisconsin: The Hop
 Napa County, California: Vine Transit
 Nassau County, New York: Nassau Inter-County Express (formerly MTA Long Island Bus) since 1 January 2012
 New Orleans, Louisiana: New Orleans Regional Transit Authority
 North Carolina State University: Wolfline
 Orlando, Florida: Operated buses for the Disney College Program. These buses would transport College Program participates from their apartment complexes to their work locations at the Walt Disney World Resort. After the restart of College Program due to the COVID-19 pandemic, the contract was given to a new bus company.
 Phoenix, Arizona: Valley Metro Bus
 Prince George's County, Maryland: TheBus
 Raleigh, North Carolina: GoRaleigh
 Redding, California: Redding Area Bus Authority. The contract has been extended for another two years from 1 July 2014.
 Rockland County, New York: Transport of Rockland
 San Diego: San Diego Metropolitan Transit System bus routes and the SPRINTER DMU light rail system
 San Francisco: Manages 20 independent providers to operate paratransit services on behalf of the San Francisco Municipal Transportation Agency (SFMTA).
 Solano County, California: SolTrans
 Southwest Ohio Regional Transit Authority: Cincinnati Bell Connector
 Texas State University: Bobcat Shuttle
 Yolo County, California: Yolobus

Former operations
 Boston: Veolia Transportation operated the MBTA's regional commuter rail operations in conjunction with Bombardier Transportation and Alternate Concepts, Inc. as the Massachusetts Bay Commuter Railroad (MBCR) until 30 June 2014. MBCR lost the bid for the contract in 2013 and Keolis, the successful bidder for the contract, took over operations on 1 July 2014.
 SuperShuttle: The shared-van service SuperShuttle operated in Canada, the United States of America, and Mexico, but it was sold to an affiliate of Blackstreet Capital Management in September 2019, after which it ceased service at the end of 2019 citing that Uber and market changes led to its demise. In the spring of 2020, the former president of SuperShuttle, Dave Bird, partnered with the owners of rideshare company zTrip, to acquire the SuperShuttle and ExecuCar (shared executive limousine) brands and made plans to relaunch service in several markets by the end of 2021.
 Taxi: Veolia sold its American taxi operations to WHC in 2019.

Oceania

Australia and New Zealand

Veolia Transport's predecessor CGEA entered the Australian market in 1998 when it formed a joint venture to purchase the Sydney Monorail and operate the Sydney Light Rail. The old Transdev entered the Australian market in 2001 with the purchase of Shorelink in Sydney's North Shore. Connex entered the New Zealand market in 2004 when it won the tender to operate rail services in Auckland.

Transdev's operations in both countries are under one subsidiary, Transdev Australasia. Transdev Australasia operates:

Australia
Transdev John Holland (in partnership with John Holland): Operates buses in Sydney, New South Wales
Transdev NSW: Operates buses in Sydney, New South Wales
Transdev Queensland: Operates buses in Brisbane, Queensland
Transdev WA: Operates buses in Perth, Western Australia
Transdev Sydney: Operates light rail in Sydney, New South Wales. Also formerly operated Sydney Monorail until June 2013
Transdev Sydney Ferries: Operates Sydney Ferries on Sydney Harbour, Sydney, New South Wales
New Zealand
Transdev Auckland: Operates passenger rail services in Auckland
Transdev Wellington (in partnership with Hyundai Rotem): Operates passenger rail services in Wellington
Howick & Eastern Buses: Operates bus services in Auckland
Mana Coach Services: Operates bus services in Wellington

Transdev Australasia operated South West Coach Lines in Western Australia until 2015, Transdev Brisbane Ferries until November 2020 and Transdev Melbourne buses until January 2022. The contract to run a third of Melbourne suburban bus routes was transferred to the Kinetic Group on 31 January 2022.

New Caledonia
Transdev owns Transdev Outre-Mer, who runs the Carsud bus operation in Nouméa, as a partnership with Carsud and Semitan. The partnership agreement was signed in April 2014. Transdev's predecessor Connex, operated the bus operation since February 2002.

Asia
, Transdev does not operate in Asia. Transdev's most recent operations were through its joint venture RATP Dev Transdev Asia until Transdev sold its share in October 2020.

Former Operations

China, Hong Kong, South Korea, India and Philippines

RATP Dev Transdev Asia (RDTA) is a joint venture between Transdev and RATP Group created in 2009 between Veolia Transport and RATP Dev. It was originally named Veolia Transport RATP Asia (VTRA) until the Transdev global rebranding in 2013. RATP Dev took over full ownership of RDTA in October 2020.

As at the takeover by RATP Dev in October 2020, RDTA operated:
Hong Kong Tramways on Hong Kong Island, Hong Kong since April 2009 (100% ownership)
Manila Light Rail Transit System Line 1 since 2015

Prior to that, RDTA (and predecessor VTRA) also formerly operated:
Reolian (65% ownership) who operated buses in Macau since August 2011 until July 2014, after the company filed for bankruptcy in October 2013.The company was replaced by Macau Nova Era de Autocarros Públicos (Macau New Era Public Bus), now merged into Transportas Companhia de Macau.
Buses in Chinese cities of Nanjing, Ma'anshan, Huaibei and Huainan as a joint venture with Nanjing Zhongbei, but they have been sold off to other companies, leaving RDTA to operate buses in Anqing only. 
Shenyang Tramways in Shenyang, China between August 2013 and 2016/17 as part of a joint venture.
Mumbai Metro Line 1 in Mumbai, India (2014–2019)
Seoul Subway Line 9 in Seoul, Korea (2009–2019).
Buses in Anqing as part of a joint venture with Nanjing Zhongbei, China since 2008

Israel
Transdev inherited from Veolia Transport the Jerusalem Light Rail project that Veolia Environment had been trying to sell since at least 2009.

As of December 2011, the agreed sale of the Jerusalem Light Rail to Egged was reported to have been held up by the Israeli state. Egged will however need Veolia's expertise for at least five years to run the light rail successfully. The sale was finally approved in August 2015.

Transdev also operated buses in Israel as Veolia Transport Israel (more commonly Connex Israel):

 Modi'in: Intercity and urban buses in a city located between Jerusalem and Tel Aviv. Formerly run by Margalit
 Ashdod: Intercity buses to Tel Aviv and Gush Dan, and to Ashkelon. Formerly run by Egged
 Tiberias: Urban and regional buses. Formerly run by Egged
 Yavne: Urban buses. Formerly run by Egged
 Lod: Urban buses and intercity buses to Tel Aviv. Formerly run by Egged
 Bnei Brak: Intercity buses to Jerusalem. Formerly run by Dan Bus Company

The buses in Modi'in were sold to Kavim in July 2013, while the rest were sold to Afikim in September 2013.

South America

Colombia
Transdev, in conjunction with three other operators, runs an  right-of-way bus line of TransMilenio system in Bogotá under the name Connexion Móvil. The contract started in 2000, and was recently extended until December 2023.

In May 2018, Cable Movil, a consortium consisting of Transdev Chile and Fanalca, won the contract to operate the new TransMiCable cable car operation in Bogotá, starting from December 2018 for a period of 5.5 years with a possible 2.5 year extension.

Chile
Transdev operates Redbus Urbano in Santiago, Chile. It is Transdev's largest bus urban networks with revenues of more than 70 million euros in 2012.

Africa

Morocco
Transdev operates the Rabat–Salé tramway, at the time the first modern light rail service in Morocco, since May 2011. Until Veolia Transdev's rebranding to Transdev in 2013, the tramway was operated under the old Transdev's name and logo. Transdev's contract to operate the tramway was renewed for another 10 years starting January 2020.

References

External links
 Transdev global official website
 Transdev UK official website
 Transdev Canada official website
 Transdev NA official website
 Transdev Australasia official website

 
Companies based in Île-de-France
French brands
Public transport operators
Transport companies established in 2011
Transport operators of France
French companies established in 2011